The Rosebery Charity Cup was a football competition organised for senior clubs from the East of Scotland.

History 
The tournament was organised by and named for an early patron of Scottish football Archibald Primrose, 5th Earl of Rosebery and received continued support from his son, Harry Primrose, 6th Earl of Rosebery, after Archibald's death in 1929. A charitable competition, the chief beneficiaries of the funds it raised were the Edinburgh Royal Infirmary and the Leith Hospital. It was traditionally played as the last games of the season and ran from the 1882–83 season to the 1944–45 season.
The trophy is on display in the Heart of Midlothian Museum.

In 1932–33, to mark the tournament's 50th anniversary, the previous season's League champions Motherwell were invited to participate, while the venue for the final, Tynecastle, was draped in primrose and rose, the recognised Rosebery racing colours.

Performance by club

See also
Glasgow Merchants Charity Cup
East of Scotland Shield
Wilson Cup (football)

References

External links
 Full results at Scottish Football Historical Archive
 Hearts in the Rosebery Charity Cup at London Hearts Supporters Club

Edinburgh football competitions
1882 establishments in Scotland
1945 disestablishments in Scotland
Defunct football cup competitions in Scotland
Recurring sporting events established in 1882
Recurring sporting events disestablished in 1945
Charity events in the United Kingdom
Charity football matches